Garrha absumptella is a moth in the family Oecophoridae, described by Francis Walker in 1864. It can be found in Australia, where it has been recorded from New South Wales and Tasmania.

References

Moths described in 1864
Garrha